The 1997 Chicago Marathon was the 20th running of the annual marathon race in Chicago, United States and was held on October 19. The elite men's race was won by Morocco's Khalid Khannouchi in a time of 2:07:10 hours and the women's race was won by Great Britain's Marian Sutton in 2:29:03.

Results

Men

Women

References

Results. Association of Road Racing Statisticians. Retrieved 2020-04-10.

External links 
 Official website

Chicago Marathon
Chicago
1990s in Chicago
1997 in Illinois
Chicago Marathon
Chicago Marathon